Wayne D. Lewis Jr. is an academic administrator who is currently serving as the sixth president of Houghton College and is the first African American president of the institution. He succeeded Dr. Shirley A. Mullen, who served in the role since 2006.

Education 
Lewis earned a Bachelor’s degree in Criminal Justice from Loyola University in 2001.  He then went on to earn a Masters in Urban Studies with a minor in Public Administration from the University of Akron’s Buchtel College of Arts and Sciences in 2002.  He also did Post-Baccalaureate Studies in Special Education-Mild/Moderate Disabilities at the University of New Orleans in 2004.  Lewis then earned his Ph.D in Educational Research and Policy Analysis with a minor in Public Administration from North Carolina State University’s College of Education in 2009.

Professional life 
Before his role as president of Houghton College, Lewis was the inaugural dean and professor of education at Belmont University. He also previously worked at the Commonwealth of Kentucky in roles such as Executive Director of Education Policy & Programs and Commissioner of Education.  Before that, Lewis worked at the University of Kentucky for 10 years as the Principal Leadership Program Chair, Assistant Professor of Educational Leadership Studies, Educational Leadership Doctoral Programs Chair, and Associate Professor of Educational Leadership.

Personal life 
Lewis is a native of New Orleans and attended St. Augustine High School there.  He currently resides in the president’s home in Houghton, NY with his wife, Monica, and his daughter, Whitley.

References 

Living people
Year of birth missing (living people)
Houghton University faculty
Loyola University New Orleans alumni
University of Akron alumni
North Carolina State University alumni
People from New Orleans